Stipe Biuk (born 26 December 2002) is a Croatian professional footballer who plays for Major League Soccer side Los Angeles FC.

Club career 
Stipe Biuk came through the ranks of Solin, before joining the Hajduk Split in 2011. While in the Hajduk academy, he attracted attention from Bayern Munich and Red Bull Salzburg. On 16 January 2021, he signed a professional contract with Hajduk, tying him to the club until 2026. At the time of signing the contract, Biuk had offers from 1899 Hoffenheim, VfL Wolfsburg, Borussia Mönchengladbach, and Galatasaray.

Hajduk Split
Biuk made his debut for Hajduk on 2 March 2021, in a Croatian Cup 3–0 victory over Zagreb, being substituted on for Jairo in the 74th minute. He made his Prva HNL debut on the 20 March 2021, starting on the left wing in Hajduk's 1–0 derby win against Šibenik, due to absence of Alexander Kačaniklić, Dimitris Diamantakos and Umut Nayir. After the match, coach Paolo Tramezzani gave Biuk no significant amount of playtime until the 2–0 derby defeat to Dinamo Zagreb on 25 April. Since then, Biuk became a regular for Hajduk, scoring three goals and delivering two assists by the end of the season. He scored his debut goal for Hajduk on 1 May, in a 3–2 derby victory over Rijeka. On 22 May, he scored in a crucial 2–0 victory over Lokomotiva Zagreb, securing a Europa Conference League qualifying spot for Hajduk.

After a rougher start of the 2021–22 season during the tenure of Jens Gustafsson, Biuk improved his form with the arrival of Valdas Dambrauskas.

Los Angeles FC
On 30 December 2022, Biuk signed a four-year contract with Major League Soccer side Los Angeles FC.

International career 
Following his good club form in the 2020–21 season, on 17 May 2021, Biuk was included in Igor Bišćan's 23-man squad for 2021 UEFA Under-21 Euro knockout stage. He made his debut on 31 May in the 2–1 quarter-final defeat to Spain, coming on for Lovro Majer in the 78th minute. He won a penalty deep in injury time, which Luka Ivanušec successfully converted and took the game to extra time; however, Javi Puado's second goal knocked Croatia out of the tournament.

Personal life 
Stipe Biuk was born in Split and grew up in Solin. His father Robert Biuk is a retired policeman who hails from Vrlika. His mother Danijela Boduljak passed away on 28 December 2011 while making a birthday cake for Stipe, collapsing in the kitchen due to a ruptured aneurysm in her head. His brothers Filip and Duje are also football players, playing for Mosor and Krško 1922 respectively.

Biuk named Marco Reus his football role model. Apart from Hajduk Split, he is also a fan of Borussia Dortmund and Liverpool.

Career statistics

References

External links

2002 births
Living people
Croatian footballers
Croatia youth international footballers
Association football forwards
Association football midfielders
Footballers from Split, Croatia
HNK Hajduk Split players
Los Angeles FC players
Croatian Football League players
First Football League (Croatia) players
People from Solin
Croatia_under-21_international_footballers